Nkosiyakhe Amos Masondo (born 21 April 1953 in Louwsburg) is a South African politician, who has served as the Chairperson of South Africa's National Council of Provinces since 23 May 2019. He was the mayor of the city of Johannesburg, South Africa, between December 2000 and 2011. He is a member of the African National Congress, and was the first elected mayor of the Unified City of Johannesburg.

Biography
Born in Louwsburg and educated in Soweto, Masondo was a participant in the anti-Afrikaans riots in 1972. He also established underground Umkhonto we Sizwe cells in Soweto, and was imprisoned on Robben Island from 1975 to 1981 for his participation in anti-apartheid activities.

After he was released, he served as a member of the Soweto Civic Association, and was again detained under the emergency regulations from June 1985 to March 1986, and again from July 1986 to 1989.

He was also elected as a member of the Gauteng Legislature, and was subsequently elected to serve as Mayor of Johannesburg in 2000.

See also
 Timeline of Johannesburg, 2000s

References

External links
 Profile on Joburg city homepage
 Interview on Joburg city homepage
 CityMayors profile
 Interview on "Joburg is advertised as a world-class city"

1953 births
Living people
People from Soweto
Zulu people
African National Congress politicians
Mayors of Johannesburg
Inmates of Robben Island